Concord, Virginia may refer to:
Concord, Brunswick County, Virginia
Concord, Campbell County, Virginia
Concord, Gloucester County, Virginia

See also 
Concord (disambiguation)